Admiral Sir Rudolph Walter Bentinck,  (20 March 1869 – 31 March 1947) was a Royal Navy officer who served as Commander-in-Chief, Plymouth from 1926 to 1929.

Early life
Rudolph was the second son of Walter Theodore Edward Bentinck, 13th Baron Bentinck (1840–1901), of a distinguished Dutch family, by his wife Henrietta Jane Christina (d. 1924), daughter of William Hinton, of The Til, Madeira, Portugal.

Naval career
Educated at the Royal Naval College, Dartmouth, Bentinck joined the Royal Navy in 1882. He took part in the Mahdist War in 1891, and was promoted to commander on 31 December 1901. He was appointed Commander of the Royal Naval College, Osborne, in 1913.

Bentinck served in the First World War, taking part in the Battle of Jutland in 1916, as Chief of Staff to Admiral Sir David Beatty, and being mentioned in despatches. After the war he became Naval Secretary. He was appointed second-in-command of the 1st Battle Squadron in the Atlantic Fleet in 1921 and went on to be Commander-in-Chief of the Africa Station in 1922. In that capacity he was briefly acting Governor-General of South Africa from December 1923 to January 1924.

Bentinck became Admiral Commanding the Reserve Fleet in March 1926 and then Commander-in-Chief, Plymouth later that year: he retired in 1929.

Family
In 1898 Bentinck married Mabel Fetherstonhaugh; they had one son and one daughter. A descendant is the entrepreneur Alice Bentinck.

References

|-

|-

|-

1869 births
1947 deaths
Royal Navy officers of World War I
Graduates of Britannia Royal Naval College
Rudolph
Captains and Commandants of the Royal Naval College, Osborne
Royal Navy admirals
Military personnel from Sussex
Knights Commander of the Order of the Bath
Knights Commander of the Order of St Michael and St George